Qaraçaycek (also, Qaraçaycək and Karachaydzhek) is a village and municipality in the Khachmaz Rayon of Azerbaijan.  It has a population of 994.  The municipality consists of the villages of Qaraçaycək and Şıxhapıt.

References 

Populated places in Khachmaz District